Mobolaji E. Aluko (born 2 April 1955) is a Professor of Chemical Engineering at Howard University. He was appointed as the inaugural vice-chancellor of Federal University, Otuoke by the Federal Government of Nigeria from 2011 till the expiration of his tenure in 2016.

References

External links
  website

Living people
Yoruba scientists
1955 births
People from Lagos
Nigerian expatriate academics in the United States
Obafemi Awolowo University alumni
Alumni of Imperial College London
University of California, Santa Barbara alumni
University at Buffalo alumni
Howard University faculty
Nigerian engineers
Yoruba academics
Academic staff of Ekiti State University
Yoruba engineers
Residents of Lagos